Lewis Brown (born 3 October 1986), also known by the nickname of "Sharky", is a New Zealand former professional rugby league footballer who played in the 2000s and 2010s, who played for the New Zealand Warriors, Penrith Panthers and Manly Warringah Sea Eagles in the National Rugby League.

Background
Brown was born in Christchurch, New Zealand.

Early years
Brown who is of Maori Descent started his rugby league career playing for the Riccarton Knights in Christchurch and attending Papanui High School. He played junior representative football for Canterbury and was a New Zealand under-16 representative. He debuted for the Canterbury Bulls in the 2005 Bartercard Cup.

Brown is related to former New Zealand representative Brendon Tuuta.

Playing career
Brown moved to Sydney, playing for Cronulla's feeder side Griffith. There he was spotted by scouts from the Sydney Roosters and they signed him for their Jersey Flegg Cup side.

He later moved to join Balmain-Ryde and the Wests Tigers, playing for their New South Wales Cup side. While he was a feature in the Premier League side, he could not break into the first grade side due to the presence of Robbie Farah and John Morris.

In 2008, the Warriors announced that they had secured Brown for the 2009 season on a one-year deal, with an option for another year. He joined the Warriors in October 2008 but arrived with a major foot injury, which hampered his pre-season. He made his National Rugby League debut for the Warriors on 3 May 2009, playing against the St George Illawarra Dragons. In 2010, he signed an extended contract that kept him at the Warriors until 2012.

In the 2011 NRL season, Brown played 22 games including the 2011 NRL Grand Final which the New Zealand Warriors lost 24–10 against Manly-Warringah at ANZ Stadium. On 28 March 2012, Brown signed a three-year contract with the Penrith Panthers, commencing in the 2013 NRL season.

In the 2014 NRL season, Brown played 22 games including Penrith's preliminary final defeat by Canterbury-Bankstown at ANZ Stadium.

On 20 June 2015, Brown signed a three-year contract with the Manly Warringah Sea Eagles starting in 2016. Brown was released by Manly-Warringah Sea Eagles at the end of the 2018 NRL season which saw the club finish second last after a horror year on and off the field.
On 16 January 2019, Brown announced his retirement from rugby league.

Representative career
Brown was named in the New Zealand national rugby league team for the 2010 Four Nations and played for the New Zealand Māori against England in the build up to the tournament.

Lewis Brown made his international debut for the New Zealand national rugby league team in the 2011 ANZAC Test against Australia. He was originally named on an extended bench, and made his debut after Greg Eastwood withdrew through injury. He also set up Kiwis' debutant winger Matt Duffie for a try in the 36th minute of the game. Made a tremendous impact within minutes of taking the field during the first half of the Australia V. New Zealand Four Nations game, scoring an impressive try as a result of a Greg Inglis knock on.

References

External links

Manly Sea Eagles profile
 Official Warriors Profile

1986 births
Living people
Auckland rugby league team players
Balmain Ryde-Eastwood Tigers players
Canterbury rugby league team players
Manly Warringah Sea Eagles players
New Zealand Māori rugby league players
New Zealand Māori rugby league team players
New Zealand rugby league players
New Zealand Warriors players
Penrith Panthers players
People educated at Papanui High School
Riccarton Knights players
Rugby league centres
Rugby league hookers
Rugby league players from Christchurch
Rugby league second-rows
New Zealand national rugby league team players